NGC 2546 is an open cluster in the constellation Puppis, discovered by Abbe Lacaille in 1751-1752 from South Africa.

References

External links
 
 

2546
Open clusters
Puppis